Anastasio Umberto Dandini, O.S.B. was a Roman Catholic prelate who served as Bishop of Imola (1552–1558).

Biography
Anastasio Umberto Dandini was ordained a priest in the Order of Saint Benedict.
On 11 May 1552, he was appointed during the papacy of Pope Julius III as Bishop of Imola succeeding his uncle Girolamo Dandini.
He served as Bishop of Imola until his death on 25 Mar 1558.

References

External links and additional sources
 (for Chronology of Bishops) 
 (for Chronology of Bishops) 

16th-century Italian Roman Catholic bishops
Bishops appointed by Pope Julius III
1558 deaths
Benedictine bishops